Events from the 1300s in Denmark.

Incumbents 
 Monarch – Christopher II of Denmark (until 1332), Interregnum (1333–1334)

Events 
1332
 January  Gerhard III, Count of Holstein-Rendsburg becomes the de facto ruler of Kutland and Funen.

1335
 Gerhard III confirms Odense's market town rights.

Births

Deaths 
 30 May 1330 – Canute Porse the Elder (born c. 1282)
 26 July 1330 – Euphemia of Pomerania (born 1285 in Pomerania)
 c. 1331 – Eric Christoffersen of Denmark, King of Denmark (born 1307)
 2 August 1332 – Christopher II of Denmark (born 1276)

References 

1330s in Denmark